Melania Ursu (July 16, 1940 – January 12, 2016) was a Romanian stage and film actress. 

Born in Sibiu, she graduated from the Institute of Theatre and Film Arts (IATC) in 1961. Ursu performed at the Cluj-Napoca National Theatre.

Her most prominent award was the Order of the Star of Romania, Knight class. In 2012 she received the UNITER (Romanian Theatrical Union) award for lifetime achievement.

Ursu died in 2016 in Cluj-Napoca, of a heart attack.

Filmography
  (1965)
 Mere roșii ("Red Apples", 1975)
  ("The Mystery of Herodotus", 1976)
  ("Green Grass of Home", 1977)
  ("January Dream", 1979)
  ("The return of Vodă Lăpușneanu", 1980)
  ("Mountains on Fire", 1980)
  ("My Beloved Traveler", 1980)
  ("The Forest Woman", 1986) 
 Flăcări pe comori ("Flames over Treasures", 1987)
 Meditație lacustră ("Lake Meditation", 1995) 
 Păcatele Evei ("Eva's Sins", 2005) 
 Feedback (2006)
  ("Kino Caravan", 2009)

References

External links

2016 deaths
1940 births
People from Sibiu
Caragiale National University of Theatre and Film alumni
Romanian film actresses
Romanian stage actresses
Romanian educational theorists
Recipients of the Order of Cultural Merit (Romania)
Knights of the Order of the Star of Romania